Rowsley is a rural locality in Victoria, Australia.

History
The post office there opened on 12 May 1890, closed on 30 April 1962, reopened on 1 January 1946 and was closed in 1950.

Greystones Homestead, a historic homestead located at 565 Glenmore Road, Rowsley, is listed on the Victorian Heritage Register. Dating from 1875–1876, the property was purchased by prominent businessman William Charles Angliss in 1934 and was still held by his descendants in 2003.

References

External links

Towns in Victoria (Australia)